Domenico della Rovere, O.P. (died 1587) was a Roman Catholic prelate who served as Bishop of Asti (1569–1587).

Biography
Domenico della Rovere was ordained a priest in the Order of Preachers.
On 3 Mar 1569, he was appointed during the papacy of Pope Pius V as Bishop of Asti.
He served as Bishop of Asti until his death in 1587.

References

External links and additional sources
 (for Chronology of Bishops) 
 (for Chronology of Bishops) 

16th-century Italian Roman Catholic bishops
Bishops appointed by Pope Pius V
1587 deaths
Dominican bishops
Della Rovere family